Smallbridge may refer to:
Smallbridge, Greater Manchester, England
Smallbridge, Suffolk, England